The American Mountain Guides Association (AMGA) is the United States' "sole representative to the 21-member International Federation of Mountain Guides Associations (IFMGA), the international governing body responsible for guiding standards and education around the world". AMGA is a non-profit organization that seeks to represent the interests of American mountain guides by providing support, education, and standards.  The Association offers training courses and certification exams in rock, alpine and ski mountaineering.

History
In 1979, 12 guides came together to form what was to become the American Mountain Guides Association as we know it today. AMGA aims to support "the guiding profession by providing representation for land use access, education, training, and examination based on international standards for guiding". As a result of this commitment, AMGA became a member of the International Federation of Mountain Guides Associations in 1997.

Mission statement
The American Mountain Guide's Association Mission
To be the leader in education, standards, and advocacy for professional guides and climbing instructors.

Associated organizations
AMGA requires that any guide who wishes to become accredited attend a certified guide program and receive wilderness medical training. Only a handful of organizations are recognized by AMGA as meeting their standards.

There are currently 30 organizations that AMGA feels meet the standards it has set out. Some of the organizations that AMGA recognizes for guide training are Colorado Mountain School, Acadia Mountain Guides Climbing School, and Rainier Mountaineering.

For wilderness first aid training, even fewer organizations are recognized by AMGA. AMGA currently recognizes only eleven organizations. A few examples of such wilderness medical training organizations are Remote Medical International and the Wilderness Medicine Institute of NOLS.

Climbing Instructor Programs 
The AMGA offers two different climbing instructor programs. The Single Pitch Instructor and the Climbing Wall Instructor.

Single Pitch Instructor 
The Single Pitch Instructor Program teaches climbing instructors to proficiently facilitate and instruct the sport of rock climbing in a single pitch setting. Certification lasts for three years. After three years current SPI's can re-take the SPI Assessment to regain the certification. The certification consists of a three day (24 hours) course and a two day (16 hours) exam. AMGA Single Pitch Instructors are expected to operate within the confines of the following terrain limitations:

 Not of wilderness nature, up to Grade 1, and is climbed without intermediate belays.
 Approaches and descents to and from climbing venues present no difficulties such as route finding, scrambling, navigating, or short roping. 
 The routes should not exceed Grade 1 or be more than one pitch in length.

Climbing Wall Instructor 
The Climbing Wall Instructor Program (CWI) was introduced in 2007 to certify professionals who teach in an indoor or artificial wall environment. There are two certifications for the CWI: AMGA CWI Top Rope and AMGA CWI Lead. The course length is a minimum of 20 hours of instruction, skills demonstration, and evaluation. The course typically runs over 2.5 days. The certification lasts for three years, and can be renewed via a one day reassessment.

AMGA CWI Lead Instructors are limited to the following terrain:

 Operate on indoor climbing and bouldering walls
 Climbing structures that involve lead climbing and the instruction of lead climbing

AMGA CWI Top Rope Instructors are limited to the following terrain:

 Operate on indoor climbing and bouldering walls
 Climbing structures that do not involve lead climbing and do not include the instruction of lead climbing.

References

External links
 

Mountain guides associations
Non-profit organizations based in Colorado
Organizations established in 1979